José Montanaro Junior (born July 29, 1958), known as Montanaro, is a Brazilian former volleyball player who competed in the 1980 Summer Olympics, in the 1984 Summer Olympics, and in the 1988 Summer Olympics.

In 1980 he was part of the Brazilian team which finished fifth in the Olympic tournament. He played five matches.

Four years later he won the silver medal with the Brazilian team in the 1984 Olympic tournament. He played all six matches.

At the 1988 Games he was a member of the Brazilian team which finished fourth in the 1988 Olympic tournament. He played all seven matches.

References

External links
 
 
 

1958 births
Living people
Brazilian men's volleyball players
Olympic volleyball players of Brazil
Volleyball players at the 1980 Summer Olympics
Volleyball players at the 1984 Summer Olympics
Volleyball players at the 1988 Summer Olympics
Olympic silver medalists for Brazil
Olympic medalists in volleyball
Medalists at the 1984 Summer Olympics